Kanchoch is a village in Sughd Region, north-western Tajikistan. It is located in Ayni District.

References

Populated places in Sughd Region